Marin Čolak (born 4 March 1984 in Zagreb) is a Croatian auto racing driver.

Career

Early Years
He started racing in karting with much of his young career was spent in Germany, including Formula Renault 2.0 Germany and the German SEAT Leon Cupra Cup. He also competed in some races of the Formula Renault 2000 Eurocup in 2001 and 2002. In 2008 he competed in the new SEAT León Eurocup, where he ended the year as runner-up.

Accident 
In November 2010, according to Croatian reports, Čolak was involved in a road accident in Croatia. The reports say that a female passenger was killed in the crash. Čolak escaped with minor injuries. In 2016, he was sentenced to three years in jail for this crash.

World Touring Car Championship
As a reward for winning a race at Brands Hatch, he was entered in two rounds of the FIA World Touring Car Championship with the SEAT backed SUNRED Engineering team.

For 2009, he entered the WTCC for a full season with an independent petrol powered SEAT Leon, under the Croatia Čolak Ingra Seat banner.

Racing record

Complete World Touring Car Championship results
(key) (Races in bold indicate pole position) (Races in italics indicate fastest lap)

References

1984 births
Living people
German Formula Renault 2.0 drivers
Formula Renault Eurocup drivers
World Touring Car Championship drivers
SEAT León Eurocup drivers
European Touring Car Cup drivers